George Goutzioulis (born 18 January 1978, in Australia) is an Australian retired soccer player who is last known to have played for Harrisfield Hurricanes in his home country in 2011.

Career

New Zealand

A member of Football Kingz for the 2001-02 National Soccer League, Goutzioulis made this 100th NSL appearance there, handed two red cards through his spell there. He also scored three goals, one an equalizer in a 2–3 loss to Northern Spirit which set the fans into exultation.  However, he was released near the end of the season, citing 'personal reasons'.

Singapore

Boosting Tampines Rovers of the Singaporean S.League in mid-season 2002, the Australian spearheaded the Stags to their first-ever major trophy, the Singapore Cup with a late-minute header.

References

External links
 By George, it is destiny after all (only accessible via NLB multimedia libraries in Singapore) 
 OzFootball Profile 
 
 

Living people
1978 births
Australian expatriate sportspeople in Singapore
Expatriate association footballers in New Zealand
Singapore Premier League players
Tampines Rovers FC players
Heidelberg United FC players
Oakleigh Cannons FC players
National Soccer League (Australia) players
Australian people of Greek descent
Association football midfielders
Australian expatriate sportspeople in New Zealand
Expatriate footballers in Singapore
Sydney Olympic FC players
Richmond SC players
Football Kingz F.C. players
South Melbourne FC players
Port Melbourne SC players
Australian soccer players